Unión Deportiva Ourense is a Spanish football club based in Ourense, in the autonomous community of Galicia. Founded in 2014, it currently plays in Tercera División.

History
UD Ourense (Unión Deportiva Ourense) was founded on July 10, 2014 with the aim of replacing dissolved CD Ourense. The club was immediately registered in the Register of Sports Entities of the Xunta de Galicia and in the Galician Football Federation. The club is owned and democratically run by its supporters.

In its first season, UD Ourense played in Tercera Autonómica (the eighth tier), the club won the 26 games played and finished as champion of the group 13, promoting to Segunda Autonómica. It repeated the success the next four seasons, reaching Tercera División.

Season to season

Detailed list of seasons

Women's team
The women's team of UD Ourense was created in 2015. Three years later, the club was retired due to the lack of players and support.

References

External links
Official website

Football clubs in Galicia (Spain)
Association football clubs established in 2014
2014 establishments in Galicia (Spain)
Divisiones Regionales de Fútbol clubs
Sport in Ourense